AYD may refer to:

 American Youth for Democracy, youth section of the Communist Party USA from October 1943 until 1945
 Another Year of Disaster, second album by the Swedish band Adept
 AYD (airline), a Mexican low-cost chartered airline
 Anyang East railway station, China Railway pinyin code AYD

See also

 Ayd